Kesteven and Grantham Girls' School (KGGS) is a grammar school with academy status for girls in Grantham, Lincolnshire, established in 1910. It has over 1000 pupils ranging from ages 11 to 18, and has its own sixth form.

History
KGGS was founded in 1910 by H Gladys Williams. Before its establishment Kesteven Local Education Authority had founded the Grantham Institute, which accepted girls. A decision to found a new county grammar school for girls was made by a joint committee of county, borough and town councils. After the Board of Education recognised Grantham Institute as a secondary grammar school, and the girls' aspect within it, they appointed a principal mistress for the Institute, who would become the headmistress of a 1910 newly built school called Kesteven and Grantham Girls' Grammar School.

The former prime minister Margaret Thatcher had been a pupil at the school between 1936 and 1943, head girl in her final year.

Second World War and evacuation
Girls from Camden School for Girls arrived on Thursday 19 October 1939. The girls had spent the previous few weeks resident in Uppingham in Rutland. The headteacher of the Camden school was Olive Wright. 450 girls were expected, but only 352 arrived. Girls from Grantham were in the classrooms in the mornings and Camden girls were in the afternoon. Camden had their first prize day on Friday 12 April 1940 at the Congregational methodist church. 
Camden girls were resident at Stonebridge House, which became the police station. The music teacher Grace Williams, a Welsh composer, arrived with the Camden school, and composed pieces whilst at Grantham. Zoologist Hilda Mabel Canter, later employed by the Freshwater Biological Association and associated with the British Phycological Society, was evacuated with the school.

Thirty-two Camden girls were confirmed at St Wulfram's Church, Grantham on Saturday 16 March 1940 by the bishop of Lincoln, Nugent Hicks. On Friday 28 June 1940, two 17-year-old Camden girls, Margaret McMillan and Marjorie Catch, had their play A Man's World broadcast as part of Theatreland on the BBC Home Service and the BBC Forces Programme, introduced by Raymond Glendenning; it featured Celia Johnson and Owen Nares. Another Camden speech day took place at the Congregational methodist church on Wednesday 6 November 1940, with an address by the Bishop of Lincoln. The Camden school moved back to Uppingham in March 1941, having stayed in Grantham for five terms.

During the war, the hockey pitch was changed to grow hay instead. Many staff under their thirties from boys' schools had to join up; this situation did not really affect girls' schools as much. Elsie Suddaby, the famous soprano performed at the school, through Grantham Music Club, on Friday 18 October 1940. Isolde Menges, the violinist, performed on Friday 22 November 1940 at the school  Colonel William Vere Reeve King-Fane was Chairman of the Governors from December 1940, until his death in 1943. The preparatory school closed in 1944.

School expansion after the war
In December 1947, the prize day was in the drill hall. A new association was formed with a French school in Châteauroux in Centre-Val de Loire. In early 1954 the school needed more buildings to have a three-form entry by September 1955.
 New buildings were added around 1955, costing £50,000 for an extra form entry. In February 1955 a contract for £57,900 built an extension and a new kitchen, with furniture costing £5,500. By 1956, there were over 500 girls at the school.

The extensions would open on Friday 11 October 1957, for a three-form entry school, with a new gym, hall and dining room, and crafts room with a hand loom
with the bishop of Grantham Anthony Otter attending the ceremony and the chair of the governors Alf Roberts, with T.W. Golby, the director of education at Kesteven, and F.W. Jenkinson, chairman of Kesteven council. The head girl was Andrea Thody. By 1957, from 1910 there had been only two headteachers. Due to the larger school, the houses Rossetti and Potter were introduced in 1958.

The school speech day was first held in the new hall on Thursday 30 October 1958. On Saturday 16 July 1960, a golden jubilee garden party was attended by Gwen Berryman (Doris Archer). Bigger 50th celebrations were held on the weekend of 22 October 1960. The school now had around 550 girls. At the Old Girls Association dinner in the school hall, the first head returned, and Margaret Thatcher attended, as her father was chairman of the governors, with T.W. Golby and some of the 1910 intake. Thatcher said at the dinner, that as an MP, she had found that there were two types of parents - one who pulled with the children, and another who did not bother a great deal.

In September 1961, the school employed its first full-time male teacher; there had been a part-time physics male teacher before. History teacher Albert Mortenson of Downey High School stayed at the school for a year; a history teacher from the school had exchanged to the US for a year. Dorothy Gillies last speech day was on Tuesday 27 October 1964; she would leave at the end of the Easter term in 1965 and return to Edinburgh, with Alf Roberts, chair of the governors. Nancie Pannell became the new headteacher, when Judith Nussey was head girl.

In the senior speech day held on Wednesday 8 November 1967, Nancie Pannell said there was a disturbing lack of ambition amongst some of our fourth and fifth formers; she added some geese try to be swans, and have to accept their limitations as time goes on, but there are far more problems over swans who are content to be geese. The netball team had been unbeaten that year, scoring 389 goals and only conceding 139. The head girl that year was Fran Goldsbrough, with deputies Valerie Smith and Janet Simmonds. Each year, there were three classes K, G and S.

The school's first headteacher died on Wednesday 7 February 1968 Alf Roberts left the governors due to ill health in October 1969; he died on Tuesday 10 February 1970, aged 77; later that month, his daughter became shadow education secretary. The BBC filmed the church service for the 60 years jubilee on Thursday 16 July 1970; the head girl was Celia Whysall.

In October 1972 at the speech day, the prizes were handed out by Enid Russell-Smith, who gave a notable candid and lurid description of how not to be approached by gentlemen at university; but she herself died in July 1989, having never been married herself. In May 1976, Suzanne Hunt won the English Schools Table Tennis under 16 competition, for the second year.

As Conservative leader, Margaret Thatcher first visited on Friday 4 March 1977.

English department
Teen author Beverley Naidoo opened the English department in November 2001. The school was awarded dual specialisms in language and science.

Curriculum
Kesteven Grantham Girls' School provides a curriculum across Key Stage 3 to 5. The sixth form curriculum is enhanced by cooperation with the nearby King’s School.

Form and house activity
Each form has a form captain and deputy, two school council members and two charity representatives. Form captains deal with problems and represent the form. A school council discusses matters and acts to improve the school and its community. Charity events are organised by forms to raise money for good causes, with a trophy given each year to the form which raises the most.

Pupils are allotted to one of six houses within the school, named after famous female writers and poets: Austen, Brontë, Browning, Eliot, Potter, and Rossetti. Each house has its own colour: Austen is purple, Potter is green, Rossetti is red, Bronte is white, Browning is black and Elliot is yellow. Houses are headed by two year 13 house captains.  The house system is maintained and supervised by three year 13 house secretaries and one member of staff.

House events include a sports day, a pantomime, choir, netball, badminton, rounders, debating, public speaking, general knowledge and dance. House pantomimes and choirs have an important place in the school's calendar each year. House assemblies are held each term, where house captains inform pupils of news, plans and ideas surrounding house events, and encourage participation in activities.

Sport
The school won the U-19 Championships of the English Schools' Table Tennis Association (ESTTA) three times in a row from 2009–11, and had also won it, 1986–88; the representative of the English Table Tennis Association for the East Midlands, Suzanne Airey, went to KGGS.

Extracurricular activity
There are school exchange programmes with Germany, France and Japan; many girls undertake one of these opportunities each year. The school's connection with Minami High School, Fukushima, Japan, involves a group of Japanese students visiting Grantham each year. A group of girls taking Spanish GCSE or A Level were recently invited to take part in a Spanish exchange in conjunction with Carre's Grammar School, Sleaford.

Peripatetic teachers run lessons in various instruments and singing. Music clubs include a school choir, female barber shop quintet, orchestra, wind band, and string group. There is a composing club, and a 'Junk group' in which students make Stomp-style music using items such as brooms, cardboard boxes and phone books. There is also an occasional magazine called News4u.

Curriculum support and revision sessions are held, some for GCSE, AS or A-level.

The school runs the Duke of Edinburgh's Award Scheme, and school sports teams and individuals compete at a national level.

KGGS holds classes that are open to the public, such as GCSE in Statistics and Digital Imaging, and GCE AS level in Science in Society.

Notable former pupils

 Swethat Baker,  (30 August 1913 - 17 September 2007), she lived at 185 Harlaxton Road, later at Purley; her husband, sergeant-pilot Eric Debnam Baker was the pilot of Hurricane P3381 of 145 Squadron who was killed on 8 August 1940 in the Battle of Britain by a Messerschmitt Bf 109 of 1/JG27; after the war she moved to Fallon, Nevada as Evelyn Holmes St-Pierre
 Georgina Callaghan, singer-songwriter, known for her 2012 album Life in Full Colour
 Freya Colbert, international swimmer
 Christina Comty-Nygren,  (1928-2007), English nephrologist, and professor of medicine at McGill University, the University of Pittsburgh, and the University of Minnesota - her great-uncle was the pathologist William Cooke who had first discovered silicosis in 1924 in Lancashire<ref>Grantham Journal Friday 21 July 1950, page 1</ref>
 Dorothy Cowlin, novelist
 Valerie Gibson, professor in high energy physics at the University of Cambridge; married to physicist Andy Parker
 Rachel Horn, civil engineer, highest-placed British female athlete in the 1995 ITU Triathlon World Championships; when at Cambridge in 2003, another fellow triathlete was the physicist Helen Czerski
 Vikki Hubbard, high jumper, placed joint 4th in the 2010 Commonwealth Games
 Holly Humberstone, singer-songwriter, winner of the 2022 BRITs Rising Star Award, also known for headlining Lewis Capaldi European tour and released her first three singles: Deep End, Falling Asleep At The Wheel, and Overkill in January to June 2020
 Amy Hunt, the fastest under-18 sprinter in the world
 Shona McCallin, member of the Great Britain women's national field hockey team  (took her A-levels elsewhere)
 Carla Rees, flautist, professor of low flutes at the Royal Academy of Music from 2021, editor of the journal of the British Flute SocietyGrantham Journal Friday 6 June 1997, page 22
 Frances Ryan, author of Crippled''
 Jane Soons, University of Canterbury’s first female professor
 Doris Stokes, well-known medium
 Margaret Thatcher,  (and her older sister Muriel), British prime minister from 1979 to 1990; she was placed in the B stream in the first year, and that year was placed top in her class, but she had to wait until her third year before she was moved into the A stream, where she was placed top every year except one, when she came second
 Clare Tomlinson, Sky Sports presenter
 Frances Tustin, internationally-known psychotherapist; her husband, a professor of electrical engineering at Imperial College London, worked on gun laying radar and servomechanisms for tanks in World War II, and he developed the bilinear transform in control theory, known as Tustin's method

References

External links

  School website

Grammar schools in Lincolnshire
Girls' schools in Lincolnshire
Schools in Grantham
Educational institutions established in 1910
1910 establishments in England
Academies in Lincolnshire